Algarrobo is a Chilean city and commune in San Antonio Province, Valparaíso Region. Located on the country's central coast, it is a popular summer resort for the population of Santiago. It is an upscale community near El Quisco and Valparaíso. The San Alfonso del Mar resort, located north of the city, is home to the world's largest outdoor pool.

Demographics
Of these, 6,628 (77.1%) lived in urban areas and 1,973 (22.9%) lived in rural areas. The population grew by 44.1% (2,633 persons) between the 1992 and 2002 censuses.

Administration
As a commune, Algarrobo is a third-level administrative division of Chile administered by a municipal council, headed by an alcalde who is directly elected every four years. The 2008-2012 alcalde is Jorge Luis Pizarro Romero. The council has the following members:
 Hipólito Aravena Escobar. (PDC)
 Manuel Catalan Aranda. (PDC)
 Javier Fuentes Torrealba (RN)
 Luís Núñez Berríos. (RN)
 Antonieta Sandoval Solís. (PDC)
 José Yanez Maldonado (Ind.)

Within the electoral divisions of Chile, Algarrobo is represented in the Chamber of Deputies by María José Hoffmann (UDI) and Víctor Torres (PDC) as part of the 15th electoral district, (together with San Antonio, Santo Domingo, Cartagena, El Tabo, El Quisco and Casablanca). The commune is represented in the Senate by Francisco Chahuán Chahuán (RN) and Ricardo Lagos Weber (PPD) as part of the 6th senatorial constituency (Valparaíso-Coast).

References

External links

  Municipality of Algarrobo
 Algarrobo satellite map

Populated places in San Antonio Province
Coasts of Valparaíso Region